Protocadherin gamma-B7 is a protein that in humans is encoded by the PCDHGB7 gene.

This gene is a member of the protocadherin gamma gene cluster, one of three related clusters tandemly linked on chromosome five. These gene clusters have an immunoglobulin-like organization, suggesting that a novel mechanism may be involved in their regulation and expression. The gamma gene cluster includes 22 genes divided into 3 subfamilies. Subfamily A contains 12 genes, subfamily B contains 7 genes and 2 pseudogenes, and the more distantly related subfamily C contains 3 genes. The tandem array of 22 large, variable region exons are followed by a constant region, containing 3 exons shared by all genes in the cluster. Each variable region exon encodes the extracellular region, which includes 6 cadherin ectodomains and a transmembrane region. The constant region exons encode the common cytoplasmic region. These neural cadherin-like cell adhesion proteins most likely play a critical role in the establishment and function of specific cell-cell connections in the brain. Alternative splicing has been described for the gamma cluster genes.

References

Further reading